What Every Woman Learns is a 1919 American silent drama film directed by Fred Niblo.

Plot

Amy (Bennett) is married to a cad but visits another man who loves her and helps her endure her marriage. After a confrontation and struggle between the men which leads to a death, Amy stands accused of the murder.

Cast
 Enid Bennett as Amy Fortesque
 Milton Sills as Walter Melrose
 Irving Cummings as Dick Gaylord
 William Conklin as John Matson
 Lydia Knott as Aunt Charlotte
 Theodore Roberts as Peter Fortesque

References

External links

1919 films
1919 drama films
Silent American drama films
American silent feature films
American black-and-white films
Films directed by Fred Niblo
1910s American films
1910s English-language films